The International Project Space (sometimes referred to as IPS:Bournville) was an art gallery located at the Bournville Centre for Visual Arts, which was a campus of Birmingham City University's Birmingham Institute of Art and Design in the Bournville district of Birmingham, England until 2013. The site is now home to the University's International College.

The gallery opened in 2002 and hosts a programme of exhibitions by local and international contemporary artists along with residencies and conferences. Former curators: Andrew Hunt, Matthew Williams, Andrew Bonacina.

Artists whose work has featured at the IPS include Hans Aarsman, Bill Brandt and Aleksandra Mir. David Osbaldeston, Steve Claydon, Ian Kiaer & Sara Mackillop, FREEE, Laure Provost.

External links
 International Project Space Official Website

References

Art museums and galleries in Birmingham, West Midlands
Birmingham City University
Contemporary art galleries in England
Tourist attractions in Birmingham, West Midlands
Art galleries established in 2002
2002 establishments in England